The Glenn L. Martin Company—also known as The Martin Company from 1957-1961—was an American aircraft and aerospace manufacturing company founded by aviation pioneer Glenn L. Martin, and operated from 1917-1961. The Martin Company produced many important aircraft for the defense of the US and allies, especially during World War II and the Cold War. During the 1950s and '60s, the Martin Company moved from the aircraft industry into the guided missile, space exploration, and space utilization industries.

In 1961, the Martin Company merged with American-Marietta Corporation, a large industrial conglomerate, forming Martin Marietta Corporation. In 1995, Martin Marietta merged with aerospace giant Lockheed to form the Lockheed Martin Corporation.

History

Origins
Glenn L. Martin Company was founded by aviation pioneer Glenn Luther Martin on August 16, 1912. He started the company building military training aircraft in Santa Ana, California, and in September 1916, Martin accepted a merger offer from the Wright Company, creating the Wright-Martin Aircraft Company. This merger did not function well, so Glenn Martin left to form a second Glenn L. Martin Company on September 10, 1917. This new company was headquartered in Cleveland, Ohio.

Mexican Revolution

In 1913, Mexican insurgents from the northwestern state of Sonora bought a single-seater Martin Pusher biplane in Los Angeles with the intention of attacking federal naval forces that were attacking the port of Guaymas. The aircraft was shipped on May 5, 1913, in five crates to Tucson, Arizona, via Wells Fargo Express, and then moved through the border into Mexico to the town of Naco, Sonora. The aircraft, named Sonora by the insurgents, was reassembled there and fitted with a second seat for a bomber position.

The Sonora, armed with rudimentary 3-inch pipe bombs, performed the first known air-to-naval bombing runs in history.

World War I

For the Dutch East Indies, several planes were delivered, with the first flight on November 6, 1915. It involved two Type TEs, six Type TTs, and eight Type Rs. Martin's first big success came during World War I with the MB-1 bomber, a large biplane design ordered by the United States Army on January 17, 1918. The MB-1 entered service after the end of hostilities. A follow-up design, the MB-2, proved successful; 20 were ordered by the Army Air Service, the first five of them under the company designation and the last 15 as the NBS-1 (Night Bomber, Short range). Although the War Department ordered 110 more, it retained the ownership rights of the design, and put the order out for bid. The production orders were given to other companies that had bid lower, Curtiss (50), L.W.F. Engineering (35), and Aeromarine (25).<ref name="cent_of_flight2">Rumerman, Judy. "Glenn L. Martin Company."  U.S. Centennial of Flight Commission, 2003. Retrieved: July 30, 2011.</ref> The design was the only standard bomber used by the Air Service until 1930, and was used by seven squadrons of the Air Service/Air Corps: Four in Virginia, two in Hawaii, and one in the Philippines.

Inter-war years
In 1924, the Martin Company underbid Curtiss for the production of a Curtiss-designed scout bomber, the SC-1, and ultimately Martin produced 404 of these. In 1929, Martin sold the Cleveland plant and built a new one in Middle River, Maryland, northeast of Baltimore.

During the 1930s, Martin built flying boats for the U.S. Navy, and the innovative Martin B-10 bomber for the Army. The Martin Company also produced the noted China Clipper flying boats used by Pan American Airways for its transpacific San Francisco to the Philippines route.

World War II
During World War II, a few of Martin's most successful designs were the B-26 Marauder  and A-22 Maryland bombers, the PBM Mariner and JRM MarsGoebel, Greg. "The Martin Mariner, Mars, & Marlin Flying Boats." Air Vectors. Retrieved: July 30, 2011. flying boats, widely used for air-sea rescue, anti-submarine warfare and transport. The 1941 Office for Emergency Management film Bomber was filmed in the Martin facility in Baltimore, and showed aspects of the production of the B-26.

Martin ranked 14th among U.S. corporations in the value of wartime production contracts. The company built 1,585 B-26 Marauders and 531 Boeing B-29 Superfortresses at its new bomber plant in Nebraska, just south of Omaha at Offutt Field. Among the B-29s manufactured there were all the Silverplate aircraft, including Enola Gay and Bockscar'', which dropped the two war-ending atomic bombs on Hiroshima and Nagasaki, Japan.

Postwar
On April 22, 1957, the company name was changed to the Martin Company.

Postwar efforts in aeronautics by the Martin Company included two unsuccessful prototype bombers, the XB-48 and the XB-51, the marginally successful AM Mauler, the successful B-57 Canberra tactical bombers, the P5M Marlin and P6M SeaMaster seaplanes, and the Martin 4-0-4 twin-engined passenger airliner.

The Martin Company moved into the aerospace manufacturing business. It produced the Vanguard rocket, used by the American space program as one of its first satellite booster rockets as part of Project Vanguard. The Vanguard was the first American space exploration rocket designed from scratch to be an orbital launch vehicle — rather than being a modified sounding rocket (such as the Juno I) or a ballistic missile (such as the U.S. Army's Redstone missile). Martin also designed and manufactured the huge and heavily armed Titan I and LGM-25C Titan II intercontinental ballistic missiles (ICBMs). Martin Company of Orlando, Florida, was the prime contractor for the US Army's Pershing missile.

The Martin Company was one of two finalists for the command and service modules of the Apollo Program. The National Aeronautics and Space Administration (NASA) awarded the design and production contracts for these to the North American Aviation Corporation.

The Martin Company went further in the production of larger booster rockets for NASA and the U.S. Air Force with its Titan III series of over 100 rockets produced, including the Titan IIIA, the more-important Titan IIIC, and the Titan IIIE. Besides hundreds of Earth satellites, these rockets were essential for the sending to outer space of the two space probes of the Voyager Project to the outer planets the two space probes of the Viking Project to Mars, and the two Helios probes into low orbits around the Sun (closer, even, than Mercury).

Finally, the US Air Force required a booster rocket that could launch heavier satellites than either the Titan IIIE or the Space Shuttle.  The Martin Company responded with its extremely large Titan IV series of rockets. When the Titan IV came into service, it could carry a heavier payload to orbit than any other rocket in production. Besides its use by the Air Force to launch its sequence of very heavy reconnaissance satellites, one Titan IV, with a powerful Centaur rocket upper stage, was used to launch the heavy Cassini space probe to the planet Saturn in 1997. The Cassini probe orbited Saturn from 2004 to 2017, successfully returning mountains of scientific data.

The halting of production of the Titan IV in 2004 brought to an end production of the last rocket able to carry a heavier payload than the Space Shuttle, which itself ended in 2011.

The Martin Company merged with the American-Marietta Corporation, a chemical-products and construction-materials manufacturer, in 1961, to form the Martin Marietta Corporation. In 1995, Martin Marietta, then the nation's third-largest defense contractor, merged with the Lockheed Corporation, then the nation's second-largest defense contractor, to form the Lockheed Martin Corporation, becoming the largest such company in the world.

The Martin Company employed many of the founders and chief engineers of the American aerospace industry, including:

 Dandridge M. Cole – moved on as aerospace engineer at General Electric
 Donald Douglas – founder of Douglas Aircraft, later as McDonnell Douglas (now part of Boeing)
 Lawrence Dale Bell – founded Bell Aircraft, now Bell Helicopter
 James S. McDonnell – founded McDonnell Aircraft, later as McDonnell Douglas (now part of Boeing)
 J.H. "Dutch" Kindleberger – CEO and chairman of North American Aviation
 Hans Multhopp – concepts used to create NASA's Space Shuttle
 C. A. Van Dusen – Brewster Aeronautical Corporation

Martin also taught William Boeing how to fly and sold him his first airplane.

Products

Aircraft

Aircraft engines
Martin 333, a four-cylinder inverted in-line piston engine

Missiles and rockets
AAM-N-4 Oriole
ASM-N-5 Gorgon V
MGM-1 Matador
MGM-13 Mace
MGM-18 Lacrosse
Bold Orion
 Titan (rocket family)
SM-68 Titan
HGM-25A Titan I
LGM-25C Titan II
Viking (rocket)

Booster rockets
The four-stage Vanguard rocket
Titan II GLV
Titan III
Titan IIIB
Titan IIIC
Titan IV
In addition, after the removal of 54 Titan IIs from alert status as ICBMs in the mid-1980s, about 50 of them were used as satellite launchers by the U.S. Air Force. The rest of them were either scrapped or used as museum pieces.

Automobile
1928 Martin 100 Aerodynamic

See also 
 Glenn L. Martin Maryland Aviation Museum
 Martin State Airport

References

External links

 Glenn L Martin Maryland Aviation Museum
 Glenn L. Martin Company Collection, The University of Alabama in Huntsville Archives and Special Collections
 
 
 
 
 

Defunct aircraft manufacturers of the United States
Aviation in Maryland
Historic American Engineering Record in Maryland
Rocket engine manufacturers of the United States
Manufacturing companies established in 1912
Companies based in Santa Ana, California
Defunct manufacturing companies based in California
1912 establishments in California
Defense companies of the United States
Aerospace companies of the United States
Manufacturing companies disestablished in 1961
1961 disestablishments in California